Jasen (in older sources Jasseno) is a small settlement in the hills northeast of Domžale in the Upper Carniola region of Slovenia.

References

External links

Jasen on Geopedia

Populated places in the Municipality of Domžale